Selah and the Spades is a 2019 American drama film written and directed by Tayarisha Poe, in her feature directorial debut. It stars Lovie Simone, Celeste O'Connor, Jharrel Jerome, Gina Torres, and Jesse Williams.

It had its world premiere at the Sundance Film Festival on January 27, 2019. It was released on April 17, 2020, by Amazon Studios.

Plot
Selah is a senior at a Pennsylvania boarding school, where she leads a faction of students called the Spades who sell drugs to other students. The school has four other factions; however, unlike the others, Selah has no one to replace her when she graduates.

Maxxie is her right-hand man, and together they have developed a secret, efficient operation. A new girl, Paloma, transfers into the school, and when she photographs Selah during Spirit Squad practice, Selah immediately sees her talent. Selah asks Paloma to take incriminating photos of her rival Bobby cheating on her boyfriend, thrusting Paloma into the school's drama. Selah tells Maxxie that Paloma reminds her of herself, and decides to begin grooming her to take over. Paloma is a fast learner and quickly proves herself in the Spades.
 
Rumors circulate that there is a rat among the Spades, and after some investigating, Selah discovers that Maxxie had been careless with the ledger used to record their sales, which had caused incorrect orders and affected their reputation. Selah confronts him and ultimately fires him.
 
The Headmaster announces that due to misconduct of a few of the students, prom has been cancelled. At an emergency meeting of the factions, Selah and Bobby are at each other's throats casting blame for the prom-cancellation, but Paloma instead suggests that they throw their own prom outside of the school grounds. Each faction agrees to help with a different aspect to make sure the dance is a success. In private, Bobby asks Paloma if she knows about Teela, the girl who was in her position before, and warns her that Selah had drugged her, causing a car crash and ultimately her expulsion. When Paloma asks Selah about Teela, Selah refuses to give a straight answer. After that conversation, Selah digs out a vial of drugs and stashes one of them in her pocket.
 
On their way to the dance, Selah slips pills into a tiny bottle of alcohol and gives it to Paloma. During the party, Paloma vomits and becomes unresponsive. Selah finds Maxxie and asks him if he remembers how potent the drug is, and he is immediately worried for Paloma's safety. The two of them find Paloma, but she runs away from them, and in her disoriented state stumbles over a railing on the side of a cliff. She manages to get hold of the railing and Selah and Maxxie hoist her to safety.

Cast

 Lovie Simone as Selah Summers
 Celeste O'Connor as Paloma Davis
Jharrel Jerome as Maxxie Ayoade
 Gina Torres as Maybelle Summers
 Jesse Williams as Headmaster Banton
 Ana Mulvoy-Ten as Bobby
 Benjamin Breault as David 
 Henry Hunter-Hall as Tarit
 Evan Roe as Two Tom
 Francesca Noel as Amber B
 Cody Sloan as Cooper
 Rae Bell as Lulu

Production
Tayarisha Poe was inspired to write the script because she wanted to see a film with characters that looked like her getting to experience the feeling of "unlimited potential and freedom" that she remembered feeling as a teenager. While working at an unfulfilling job, she set a goal for herself to write one scene each day. Inspired by the unconventional nature of the film La Jetée, she imagined the story of Selah being told through a variety of nonlinear media: a website of short stories, short films, music and photographs which together would tell a complete story. This project, which she called an "overture", launched online in 2014 and quickly garnered attention, including from film director Terence Nance.  Eventually Poe changed direction and crafted the story into a feature film, believing that the audience's experience watching a two-hour film in a single sitting was necessary for the project to work.

Shooting for the film was originally scheduled to begin in 2015, but there were problems with the financing, and it was postponed. Poe continued developing the script through the Screenwriters Lab and the Directors Lab hosted by the Sundance Institute. Poe was also selected to participate in the Sundance Institute's Catalyst Program, which helps pair filmmakers with investors. Through that process she met producer Lauren McBride and was able to pitch her idea to a room of investors, both of which led to the film being produced.

Shooting lasted for 25 days in the summer of 2018, with most of the filming taking place on a campus in Wenham, Massachusetts. The film's director of photography, Jomo Fray, has said the visual style was inspired by the album Anti by Rihanna. Handheld camera shots are used near the end of the film to represent Selah's gradual loss of power. For most of the film, the colors tend toward blueish to give it a cold feeling, but warm colors were chosen in moments where "something unnatural is happening or there is deep violence entering into the space". The film's creative team set different color palettes for each of the factions in the story.

Release
It had its world premiere at the Sundance Film Festival on January 27, 2019. In July 2019, Amazon Studios acquired distribution rights to the film, with plans for an original series based on the film. The film was released online on April 17, 2020.

Because the online premiere happened during the confinement period of the COVID-19 pandemic, Amazon Studios partnered with restaurants in Los Angeles, San Francisco, Atlanta, Boston, Philadelphia, and other cities to deliver catered meals to people's homes to celebrate the online premiere. The goal was to support local businesses that were losing money during the shut-downs as well as raise money to support local charities.

Critical reception
The website's critics consensus reads: "A smart, well-acted, and refreshingly messy coming-of-age story, Selah and the Spades suggests a bright future for debuting writer-director Tayarisha Poe." On Metacritic, the film has a weighted average score of 69 out of 100, based on 29 critics, indicating "generally favorable reviews".

In Rolling Stone, David Fear praised the filmmaker. "You can tell there’s a voice and vision behind Selah and the Spades, one that’s likely to come into its own after some seasoning. It might seem like faint praise to throw a 'watch this space' sign on top of what is indeed a more-than-impressive first movie. But think of how many debuts of fresh young filmmakers you’ve seen over the years, and how that initial spark eventually gifted us with careers defined by exponential level-ups. That’s how you feel watching this. 'They never take girls seriously,' Selah complains at one point. 'It’s a mistake the whole world makes.' Only an idiot would not take Poe seriously after this. You get the sense she’s just getting warmed up."

Selah and the Spades was a New York Times Critics Pick. Critic Teo Bugbee wrote that "While there is simple pleasure in watching a movie that is so precisely produced, Selah and the Spades aims to do more than look good. It is expressive, using images to make dynamic statements — student leaders on opposing sides of a table become a makeshift war council; Selah swipes her braids over her shoulder and is transformed into a figure of ultimate power."

Peter Bradshaw of The Guardian likened it to Heathers and suggested "it is an intriguing, opaque, tonally elusive story that seems weirdly unfinished."

References

External links
 Official Website hosting the original multimedia version of the story (archived in 2015 by the Wayback Machine)
 
 

2019 films
2019 drama films
2010s coming-of-age drama films
2010s high school films
Amazon Studios films
2019 directorial debut films
2019 independent films
American coming-of-age drama films
Films set in boarding schools
Amazon Prime Video original films
2010s English-language films
2010s American films
African-American films